Sence Valley Forest Park is located between Ibstock and   Heather in North West Leicestershire, and within the National Forest, England.

It is situated on the site of a former open cast mine where, between 1982 and 1996, eight million tonnes of coal were extracted by opencast mining. The 60-hectare site has since been transformed by tree planting and the creation of lakes and is now managed by Forestry England. The River Sence flows through the park. A series of paths provide access to a picnic area and the various fishing opportunities. There are also toilets and parking facilities for both the able bodied and the disabled.

References

External links
 

Parks and open spaces in Leicestershire